Zhao Pengfei (February 1, 1920 – January 31, 2005) was a member of the Chinese Communist Party. He served as Chairman of the Beijing People's Congress from 1983 to 1993 and Vice Chairman of the Beijing Chinese People's Political Consultative Conference (CPPCC) from 1979 to 1983.

Biography 
Zhao was Manchu by descent.  He was born in Yi County, Hebei province. He joined the Communist party in March 1939.

References 

1920 births
2005 deaths
Politicians from Baoding
Deputy mayors of Beijing
People's Republic of China politicians from Hebei
Manchu politicians
Chinese Communist Party politicians from Hebei
Delegates to the 3rd National People's Congress
Delegates to the 5th National People's Congress
Delegates to the 6th National People's Congress
Delegates to the 7th National People's Congress
Delegates to the 8th National People's Congress
Members of the 3rd Chinese People's Political Consultative Conference